The Tōseiha or  was a political faction in the Imperial Japanese Army active in the 1920s and 1930s. The Tōseiha was a grouping of moderate officers united primarily by their opposition to the radical Kōdōha (Imperial Way) faction and its aggressive imperialist and anti-modernization ideals. The Tōseiha rivaled  the Kōdōha for influence in the army until the February 26 Incident in 1936, when the Kōdōha was de facto dissolved and many supporters were disciplined or executed. The Tōseiha became the primary influence in the army, but the Kōdōha ideology and its supporters continued to influence Japanese militarism into the late 1930s.

Background 

The Empire of Japan had enjoyed economic growth during The First World War but this ended in the early 1920s with the Shōwa financial crisis. Social unrest increased with the growing polarization of society and inequalities, with the labor unions increasingly influenced by socialism, communism and anarchism, but the industrial and financial leaders of Japan continued to get wealthier through their inside connections with politicians and bureaucrats. The military was considered "clean" in terms of political corruption, and elements within the army were determined to take direct action to eliminate the perceived threats to Japan created by the weaknesses of liberal democracy and political corruption.

An ultranationalist faction within the army called the Kōdōha (Imperial Way) was formed by General Sadao Araki and his protégé, Jinzaburō Masaki, who envisioned a return to an idealized pre-industrialized, pre-westernized Japan. The Tōseiha formed in reaction to the radical Kōdōha and attempted to represent the more conservative and moderate elements within the army. The Tōseiha and Kōdōha both adopted ideas from totalitarian and fascist political philosophies, and shared the fundamental ideals that national defense must be strengthened through a reform of national politics and espoused a strong skepticism for political party politics and representative democracy. Although the factions shared key ideals, opposition was based on how to achieve them.

Opposition
The Tōseiha was a non-regional coalition, as opposed to Araki's reintroduction of regional politics into army promotions and policy decisions. Many Tōseiha members were promising graduates of the Imperial Japanese Army Academy and Army Staff College, and were concerned about Araki's emphasis of the spiritual morale of the army instead of modernization and mechanization. Rather than the confrontational approach of the Kōdōha, which wanted to bring about the Showa Restoration through violence and revolution, the Tōseiha sought reform by working within the existing system. The Tōseiha foresaw that a future war would be a total war, and to maximize Japan's industrial and military capacity would require the cooperation of Japan's bureaucracy and the zaibatsu conglomerates which the Kōdōha despised.

The Kōdōha strongly supported the hokushin-ron ("Northern Expansion Doctrine") strategy of a pre-emptive strike against the Soviet Union in the belief that Siberia was in Japan's sphere of interest. Although there were supporters of the Northern Expansion in the Tōseiha, the faction largely favored a more cautious defense expansion.

The name "Tōseiha" was pejorative and was coined and was                                used only by Kōdōha members and sympathizers.

Decline
In late 1931, the Manchurian Incident  and the subsequent Japanese invasion of Manchuria saw the two factions struggle against each other for dominance over the military. The Kōdōha were initially dominant, but after Araki's resignation in 1934 due to ill health their influence began to wane. The February 26 Incident in February 1936 caused a widespread purge of the Kōdōha leadership from the military and the faction was de facto dissolved, while the Tōseiha became the dominant influence in the Japanese military but lost most of its raison d'être and gradually disbanded.

See also
 Kōdōha

References

Notes

Politics of the Empire of Japan
Imperial Japanese Army
Far-right politics in Japan
Japanese militarism
Anti-communist organizations in Japan